The Way I Spent the End of the World is the feature-length film debut of Romanian director Cătălin Mitulescu. It was released on September 15, 2006.

Synopsis
The film is about 17-year-old Eva and 7-year-old Lilu, a sister and brother living in Bucharest during the final years of the communist regime of Nicolae Ceaușescu. After Eva is expelled from her high school for her uncooperative attitude, she is sent to a technical school where she meets Andrei, with whom she plans to escape communist Romania by swimming across the Danube into Yugoslavia and relocating to Italy.  Lilu and his friends, meanwhile, volunteer for a children's choir scheduled to sing for Ceaușescu, hoping this will give them a chance to assassinate the dictator.

Cast and characters

The Matei family
 Dorotheea Petre as Eva Matei
 Timotei Duma as Lalalilu Matei
 Carmen Ungureanu as Maria Matei
 Mircea Diaconu as Grigore Matei
 Jean Constantin as Uncle Florică

Lilu's friends
 Valentino Marius Stan as Tarzan
 Marian Stoica as Silvică

Eva's friends
 Cristian Văraru as Andrei, Eva's friend
 Ionuț Becheru as Alexandru Vomică, Eva's boyfriend

Others
 Valentin Popescu as the music teacher
 Grigore Gonta as Ceaușică
 Florin Zamfirescu as the school director
 Monalisa Basarab as choir teacher
 Corneliu Țigancu as Bulba
 Nicolae Enache Praida as Titi

Awards
 Dorotheea Petre - Premiul de interpretare feminină (Female actor award)
 Dorotheea Petre - Un Certain Regard Award for Best Actress, 2006 Cannes Film Festival

Alternative titles
 Comment j'ai fêté la fin du monde (French title) 
 How I Celebrated the End of the World (alternative translation)

See also
 Romanian New Wave

References

External links
 Official website
 
 Profile at cinemagia.ro
 The Way I Spent the End of the World at Film Movement - US Distributor

Study on 1989 in Romanian Cinema https://www.academia.edu/3671294/Post-Heroic_Revolution_Depicting_the_1989_Events_in_the_Romanian_Historical_Film_of_the_Twenty-First_Century

2006 films
2000s Romanian-language films
2006 drama films
Films directed by Cătălin Mitulescu
Works about the Romanian Revolution
Romanian drama films
2006 directorial debut films